The Best of Hanson: Live & Electric is the second live album by Hanson, and is the first live album to be released under their independent record label 3CG Records. Live & Electric was recorded in June 2005 over two nights at the Palais Theatre, Melbourne, Australia and was released on October 11, 2005.

Track listing

Disc 1 (CD)
 "Optimistic" – 5:44 (Radiohead cover)
 "Every Word I Say" – 4:41
 "Where's the Love?" – 4:40
 "Look at You" – 5:57
 "Strong Enough to Break" – 4:05
 "I Will Come to You" – 3:32
 "Underneath" – 4:47
 "Hand in Hand" – 6:24
 "In a Little While" – 4:43 (U2 cover)
 "Penny & Me" – 3:52
 "MMMBop" – 3:50
 "This Time Around" – 4:02
 "Rock 'n' Roll Razorblade" – 5:01
 "If Only" – 4:37
 "Song to Sing" – 4:26

Disc 2 (DVD)
 "Penny & Me"  (music video)
 "Lost Without Each Other" (music video)
 "Underneath" (music video)
 "Underneath" (director's cut)
 "Crazy Beautiful"
 "Being Me"
 "Strong Enough to Break" (documentary trailer)

Charts
United States
 Billboard Top 200 Albums – No. 182
 Billboard Independent Albums – No. 15

References

Hanson (band) albums
2005 live albums
2005 video albums
Music video compilation albums
2005 compilation albums
Cooking Vinyl live albums
Cooking Vinyl compilation albums
Cooking Vinyl video albums